KLOX is a Christian radio station licensed to Creston, Iowa, broadcasting on 90.9 MHz FM.  KLOX had a construction permit to upgrade its license to C2 class and increase its effective radiated power to 45,000 watts, which would have given it coverage in the Des Moines metropolitan area.  The station is owned by Florida Public Radio, Inc. and rebroadcasts KSKB 99.1 in Brooklyn, Iowa.

References

External links
KLOX's official website

LOX
Radio stations established in 2005
2005 establishments in Iowa